Baisha is a town of Yufeng District, Liuzhou, Guangxi, China. , it has 6 villages under its administration.

References

Towns of Guangxi
Liuzhou